The Gulls (Chaiki) is a 2015 Russian drama directed by Ella Manzheeva and starring fashion model Eugenia Mandzhieva in her big screen debut. Set against the backdrop of modern-day Kalmykia, it has been presented in various international festivals including the Berlinale and was awarded Best Debut at Kinotavr.

Plot 
Unhappily married to a fisherman, Elza (Eugenia Mandzhieva) finds out she is pregnant just as her husband disappears at sea.

Cast 
Eugenia Mandzhieva as Elza
Sergey Adianov
Evgeny Sangadzhiev
Lyubov Ubushieva
Dmitry Mukeyev

Release 
The Gulls premiered at the 2015 Berlinale and went on to be screened at various film festivals including Edinburgh, Warsaw and Karlovy Vary. It was awarded Best Debut at Kinotavr.

It was released in Russia in October/November 2015, the first film about Kalmykia in Kalmyk language to hit theaters in 30 years.

Awards 
 2015 Kinotavr – winner, best debut
 2015 Asia Pacific Screen Awards – nominee, UNESCO Award

References

External links
 

2015 films
Kalmyk culture
Russian drama films
2015 drama films
2010s Russian-language films
Kalmyk-language films